Gerdeh Sur (also Romanized as Gerdeh Sūr; also known as Gerdesur and Gerd Sūr) is a village in Lahijan-e Gharbi Rural District, Lajan District, Piranshahr County, West Azerbaijan Province, Iran. At the 2006 census, its population was 486, in 88 families.

References 

Populated places in Piranshahr County